The 2014 USASA National Women's Open was the 19th staging of the tournament, and the second under a new format that eliminates regional qualification.  The finals included eight WPSL teams and took place from June 26 to 29, with the annual Amateur competitions taking place concurrently.

The defending champions were the Houston Aces who were the second professional team to enter, and win, the competition.

The eight teams participating in the Open Bracket of the 2014 National Women's Championships were the ASA Chesapeake Charge, FC Surge, Fire & Ice SC, Houston Aces, Aces South Select Academy, NY Athletic Club, RSL Women, and Tampa Bay Hellenic, the competition format being a partial round-robin, similar to the previous year.  After the round-robin was complete, the top two teams played a final match, with NY Athletic Club edging out WPSL-East rivals the ASA Chesapeake Charge.

With the win, NYAC surpassed FC Indiana as the club with the second-most victories in the competition, and the most wins for any active club (as Ajax America Women folded before the 2014 WPSL season).

Group play

Schedule

Standings

Final

References

2014
Open
United
Auburndale, Florida
National Women's Open
National Women's Open